Lewis Johnston  (born 3 March 1991) is an Australian rules footballer who played for the Sydney Swans and Adelaide Football Club in the Australian Football League (AFL).

AFL career

Sydney 

Johnston was drafted to Sydney with the 12th selection in the 2008 AFL Draft.

From North Adelaide, Johnston is seen as a future key-position forward as he is tall, strong in the air and a clever ground player. He was named at centre-half forward in the All-Australian team following the 2008 AFL Under 18 Championships. Originally from Port Pirie, South Australia, a foot injury during the 2009 season saw Johnston failing to make his debut.

In round 10 2011 against , Johnston finally made his senior debut for the Swans.

Adelaide 

In October 2011 Johnston was traded back to his home state to the Adelaide in exchange for Tony Armstrong. He made his debut for Adelaide in round 20 of the 2012 AFL season against .

In 2013 Johnston was not selected to play for Adelaide until round 19 against . In the last Showdown to be played at AAMI Stadium, Johnston kicked 4 goals. Due to a number of injuries his career was cut short, and was delisted by Adelaide at the conclusion of the 2014 AFL season.

References

External links

Sydney Swans players
Living people
1991 births
Australian rules footballers from South Australia
Adelaide Football Club players
North Adelaide Football Club players
Adelaide Football Club (SANFL) players
People from Port Pirie